Shoot to Kill (known outside North America as Deadly Pursuit) is a 1988 American buddy cop action thriller film directed by Roger Spottiswoode and starring Sidney Poitier (in his first role in eleven years), Tom Berenger, Clancy Brown, Andrew Robinson and Kirstie Alley.

Plot

A man is discovered breaking into his own San Francisco jewelry store in the dead of night. Upon questioning by the FBI, it is discovered that his wife is being held hostage at their home by a brutal extortionist who demands the diamonds in the shop's safe in exchange for the woman's life. During a standoff outside the jeweler's home, the family maid is sent out the front door with a message for the FBI; she is promptly shot by the unseen extortionist, who demands the jeweler's Mercedes, which he will use to escape. The killer and the jeweler's wife travel in the Mercedes to the docks with FBI agent Warren Stantin following them. Following a tense exchange between Stantin and the killer, the jeweler's wife is shot in her left eye and killed. The police then attempt to pursue what they believe to be a getaway boat, only to learn it is unmanned, and the killer gets away. Feeling that he has failed, Stantin becomes obsessed with finding the killer and trails him into the rugged forests of Washington.

Upon Stantin's arrival in Washington, a naked male body is discovered in a local mine shaft. Stantin arrives to investigate the body and sees that the man has been shot through the eye. Stantin becomes convinced that the person responsible for the killing of the man in the mine is the extortionist, who has now likely assumed the identity of the dead man. Investigating, Stantin learns that Sarah Rennell, a fishing guide, is leading a fishing party from the mine into the woods. Stantin learns that Sarah's partner Jonathon Knox is an expert on the local wilderness, and seeks Knox's help locating Sarah and the fishermen. Unimpressed with a big city FBI agent, Knox prepares to head into the wilderness alone to rescue Sarah, but Stantin threatens him with arrest for obstruction of justice, forcing Knox to lead Stantin into the mountains. Knox repeatedly tries to convince Stantin to return to the town and wait for him, but Stantin refuses and trudges on.

Meanwhile, the fishing party proceeds into the mountains. A fisherman slips on a ledge, and another in the group, Steve, attempts to help him. While doing so, a gun falls out of Steve's backpack and into a crack in the rocks. Steve claims he is a cop and demands the dangling fisherman hand him the gun. When he does so, Steve kills him and the rest of the fishing party, one by one, by pushing them off the ledge. Needing Sarah as his guide, Steve convinces Sarah to lead him through the mountains to Canada, where he says he will let her go.

While in pursuit, Knox and Stantin encounter a basket on a rope that is used to cross a gorge. With the basket stuck on the opposite side, Knox attempts to retrieve the basket, but it breaks free and hits him. Knox falls and is slammed into the rocks, but Stantin pulls Knox to safety. Stantin asks Knox, "You mountain men do this kind of shit a lot?" Knox replies, "Every damn day!" Stantin and Knox make camp for the night, while Steve and Sarah stop at the fishing party's cabin. The next morning, Stantin and Knox stumble upon the bodies of the fishermen in the stream and Knox becomes convinced that Sarah is now dead. Upon reaching the cabin occupied by Steve and Sarah the previous evening, Stantin and Knox discover a note to the FBI in Sarah's handwriting from the killer, and Knox realizes Sarah is still alive.

Knox attempts to leave Stantin at the cabin, thinking he will make better time alone, but Stantin eventually convinces him to bring him along. As Stantin and Knox rise ever higher into the mountains, Stantin has a very difficult time with the altitude, and is temporarily placed in a tent by Knox to rest, but he continues to climb anyway. When Stantin is too exhausted to go further, Knox pulls him up the rest of the way. At the top of the mountain, Stantin and Knox are caught in a snowstorm, forcing Knox to dig a cave for shelter. Sarah is forced to eat raw fish after Steve puts out their cooking fire, fearing the smoke will cause authorities to find them.

With the storm passed, Knox and a recovered Stantin return to the pursuit with a new respect for one another. At one point, Stantin and Knox encounter a very large grizzly bear. Knox falls and hits his head on a rock, incapacitating him, but Stantin manages to scare the bear away. Meanwhile, Sarah manages to break free from Steve and attempts to run away, and Steve fires his gun at her. With Stantin and Knox now in hot pursuit, Steve recaptures Sarah and they get into the cab of a passing logging truck, evading capture yet again.

Stantin and Knox arrive in Vancouver and learn of a break-in at a local residence. During their investigation, they learn that Steve and Sarah had broken into the residence to eat and clean up. The investigation also turns up that a call to a Vancouver number was made from the residence during the robbery. The Vancouver Police Department extend their assistance to Stantin and Knox. Stantin learns that the Vancouver number that was called from the residence was to a diamond broker. That evening, Stantin and Knox stage a break-in at the home of the diamond broker, and the diamond broker confesses as to where he is meeting Steve to get the diamonds.

Stantin and Knox stake out the meeting location and find Steve holding Sarah, waiting for the diamond broker. Steve spots Knox and begins shooting at him. He carjacks a sport utility vehicle while Stantin, Knox, and the police chase him through the city streets. After losing sight of Steve and Sarah during the chase, Stantin and Knox discover the stolen vehicle on a departing ferry and begin searching for Steve and Sarah. While the police board the ferry where the car was located, Stantin and Knox realize that Steve and Sarah are on another ferry, Steve having used the vehicle as a decoy.

Stantin and Knox board the second ferry as it leaves the dock and begin searching for Steve and Sarah. They find them on the vehicle level of the ferry, and a shootout erupts. Eventually, a standoff occurs between Stantin and Steve on the mid-level of the ferry. When Knox jumps down from an upper level to distract Steve, Stantin shoots Steve in the ear, and he lets Sarah go. Stantin chases Steve throughout the ferry. When Steve attempts to hold a passenger and her two children hostage, Stantin draws Steve's attention and is shot multiple times. Steve attempts to execute Stantin by shooting him through the eye, but his gun misfires. An angry Steve then attempts to throw Stantin overboard, but they both fall into the water, and Stantin is able to shoot Steve in the torso, then the eye, killing him. Knox jumps into the water and brings Stantin to safety. While visiting Stantin on an ambulance boat, Knox asks Stantin, "You FBI guys do this kind of shit a lot?" to which Stantin smiles and replies, "Every damn day."

Cast

Reception

Box office
The film was a box office success, grossing $29.3 million on a $15 million budget.

Critical response
On Rotten Tomatoes the film holds a 100% rating based on reviews from 14 critics.

Janet Maslin of The New York Times remarked that it "marks the return of Sidney Poitier after a long absence from the screen, and a reappearance of good old-fashioned storytelling technique as well. This is essentially a formula film, and as such it's nothing fancy. But it has crisp, spare direction, enormous momentum and a story full of twists and turns. For anyone who thinks they don't make spine-tingling detective films the way they used to, good news: they've just made another."

In a three-star review, Roger Ebert recalled that it was "yet another example, rather late in the day, of the buddy movie, that most dependable genre from the early 1970s. The formula still works. Two characters who have nothing in common are linked together on a dangerous mission, and after a lot of close calls they survive, prevail and become buddies." He stated that Poitier "is probably not going to win any awards for this performance, but it's nice to have him back."

In a mixed review, Shelia Benson opined in the Los Angeles Times that "too many cooks overlooked too many mistakes of character and logic here; they seem to have made characters out of smudgy carbons instead of living tissue. The Poitier and Berenger roles are perfunctorily sketched, their exchanges sometimes excruciatingly embarrassing. It's nice to have a leading woman who knows her way around the outdoors, but every chance possible to have intelligence pitted against brute force has been ignored. In "Shoot to Kill" (MPAA-rated R for violence) the scenery is wild, the movie is a walk on the tame side."

References

External links

 
 

1988 films
1988 action thriller films
1980s adventure thriller films
1980s buddy cop films
1980s chase films
1980s crime thriller films
1980s English-language films
American action thriller films
American adventure thriller films
American buddy cop films
American buddy action films
American chase films
American crime thriller films
Films about the Federal Bureau of Investigation
Films directed by Roger Spottiswoode
Films scored by John Scott (composer)
Films set in forests
Films set in Seattle
Films set in Vancouver
Films shot in San Francisco
Films shot in Vancouver
Films with screenplays by Daniel Petrie Jr.
Mountaineering films
Touchstone Pictures films
1980s American films